Māris Bružiks (born 25 August 1962 in Pļaviņas, Latvia) is a retired triple jumper who represented the USSR, and later, following its dissolution, Latvia.

He first won the European Athletics Indoor Championships in 1986, setting a championship record (CR) with 17.54 metres. The record still stands, having been equalled by Christian Olsson in 2002. Outdoor Bružiks reached 17.56 metres, in September 1988.

He was New York City-based former model Ines Misan's first husband.

Achievements

External links

References

1962 births
Living people
People from Pļaviņas
Soviet male triple jumpers
Latvian male triple jumpers
Athletes (track and field) at the 1992 Summer Olympics
Olympic athletes of Latvia
European Athletics Championships medalists
Universiade medalists in athletics (track and field)
Universiade bronze medalists for the Soviet Union
Medalists at the 1987 Summer Universiade